Šárka Sudová (born January 23, 1986 in Jablonec nad Nisou) is a Czech freestyle skier, specializing in Moguls .

Sudová competed at the 2006 and 2010 Winter Olympics for the Czech Republic. Her best finish came in 2010, when she placed 25th in the qualifying round of the moguls, failing to advance to the final. In 2006, she finished 26th in the preliminary round, and did not advance.

As of April 2013, her best showing at the World Championships is 17th, in the dual moguls event in 2005 and 2007 .

Sudová made her World Cup debut in December 2003. As of April 2013, her best World Cup event finish is 16th place, at Voss in 2006/07. Her best World Cup overall finish in moguls is 26th, in 2006/07.

She is the younger sister of Nikola Sudová.

References

1986 births
Living people
Olympic freestyle skiers of the Czech Republic
Freestyle skiers at the 2006 Winter Olympics
Freestyle skiers at the 2010 Winter Olympics
Sportspeople from Jablonec nad Nisou
Czech female freestyle skiers